Onaero is a settlement in northern Taranaki, in the North Island of New Zealand. Onaero was the site of the No. 2 Company Redoubt, a British military installation created during the Second Taranaki War by soldiers from the Tikorangi Redoubt in 1865, however it was abandoned several months later.

Demographics

7017184 had a population of 75 at the 2018 New Zealand census, a decrease of 3 people (−3.8%) since the 2013 census, and unchanged since the 2006 census. There were 39 households, comprising 39 males and 36 females, giving a sex ratio of 1.08 males per female. The median age was 57.2 years (compared with 37.4 years nationally), with 6 people (8.0%) aged under 15 years, 6 (8.0%) aged 15 to 29, 39 (52.0%) aged 30 to 64, and 21 (28.0%) aged 65 or older.

Ethnicities were 88.0% European/Pākehā, 16.0% Māori, and 4.0% Pacific peoples. People may identify with more than one ethnicity.

Although some people chose not to answer the census's question about religious affiliation, 52.0% had no religion, and 36.0% were Christian.

Of those at least 15 years old, 18 (26.1%) people had a bachelor's or higher degree, and 6 (8.7%) people had no formal qualifications. The median income was $39,600, compared with $31,800 nationally. 12 people (17.4%) earned over $70,000 compared to 17.2% nationally. The employment status of those at least 15 was that 33 (47.8%) people were employed full-time, and 15 (21.7%) were part-time.

Further reading

General historical works
See

Environment

Geology

Maori
See

Maps
For a 1969 map of the scenic reserves within north Taranaki (including the Onaero River, whose estuary forms the setting for the community and its beach resort) see  .

Notes

New Plymouth District
Populated places in Taranaki